Select Stakes may refer to one of the following races:

 Select Stakes (Great Britain), a discontinued flat horse race in Great Britain
 Select Stakes (United States), a horse race in the United States
 Select Stakes (greyhounds), a greyhound race in Great Britain
 Select Stakes (Irish greyhounds), a greyhound race in Ireland